Yakoruda Glacier is a glacier on the west slopes of Dryanovo Heights, Greenwich Island in the South Shetland Islands, Antarctica situated west of Teteven Glacier and northwest of Murgash Glacier.   It extends 3.5 km in north-south direction and 2.5 km in east-west direction, is bounded by Greaves Peak, Hrabar Nunatak and Crutch Peaks to the north, Lloyd Hill to the east and Kerseblept Nunatak to the south, and drains westwards into Berende Cove, McFarlane Strait.

The feature is named after the town of Yakoruda in southwestern Bulgaria.

Location

See also
 List of glaciers in the Antarctic
 Glaciology

Maps
 L.L. Ivanov et al. Antarctica: Livingston Island and Greenwich Island, South Shetland Islands. Scale 1:100000 topographic map. Sofia: Antarctic Place-names Commission of Bulgaria, 2005.
 L.L. Ivanov. Antarctica: Livingston Island and Greenwich, Robert, Snow and Smith Islands. Scale 1:120000 topographic map.  Troyan: Manfred Wörner Foundation, 2009.

References
 Yakoruda Glacier. SCAR Composite Antarctic Gazetteer
 Bulgarian Antarctic Gazetteer. Antarctic Place-names Commission. (details in Bulgarian, basic data in English)

External links
 Yakoruda Glacier. Copernix satellite image

Glaciers of Greenwich Island